| website             = 
}}

Denki is an interactive television and console game developer based in Dundee, Scotland. The company is the developer of over 180 console and interactive television games, covering a range of platforms. Denki has worked extensively in the digital interactive television (IDTV) market, with the majority of their titles created specifically for digital interactive television DirecTV platform.

History
Denki was founded on 20 March 2000 by four former DMA Design employees. The company was set up to be a design-driven development studio, focused on the creation of video games. Denki's intention was to develop games for a variety of smaller platforms, including the Game Boy Advance, which the company saw as opening the games market up to a new, more "casual" audience.

The company created two original new games for the Game Boy Advance. The first was a puzzle game called Denki Blocks! Published by Rage Software in September 2001. This was followed by a platform-style game called Go! Go! Beckham! Adventure on Soccer Island – based on the famous English footballer – also published by Rage in August 2002. Both games picked up widespread critical acclaim and Denki Blocks! received several awards. However sales for both titles did not meet expectations.

As part of the promotional campaign for Denki Blocks!, the company created a version of the game for the newly launched games service on Sky Television in the UK. The response to the game was positive and Denki made the decision to focus on this new platform.

Digital Interactive Television games
Denki Blocks!, Denki's first title for Sky Television was released on 9 October 2001 when Sky Gamestar launched.  It was accessible by all Sky digital subscribers, using only the standard set-top box and controller. Given the favourable response to this initial title, Denki was asked to create a number of other titles for Sky – both original and based on brands from television and movies.

Over the next seven years, Denki focused on DiTV games. The company refined their design and development process to the point where it could take an agreed design document and produce a completed title in under ten weeks.

Brands and licences
Denki has worked with many of the world's largest media companies, releasing games based upon famous characters, brands and licenses from across the movie, television and videogames industries.

3MRT
Aardman
Atari
Bell ExpressVu
British Broadcasting Corporation
Cartoon Network
Celador
Digital Bridges (I-play)
Disney
DirecTV
DreamWorks
Eidos Interactive
Endemol
Fremantle
Hasbro
Lego
Mattel
Microsoft
Mind Candy
Namco
Nickelodeon
Nintendo
Paramount
Pat Sajak Games
PBS
Penguin
Pixar
Rage
Realtime Worlds
Sky
Sky Sports
Spil Games
Taito
The Tetris Company
Universal
Warner Bros.
Waterfront Entertainment

In May 2007, Denki signed a deal with Waterfront, to provide games to DirecTV in North America for DirecTV's new Games Lounge service. Denki initially provided nine games though that number has grown.

In September 2008, Denki announced that DiTV games would become a much smaller part of the company's output, as the company returned to its original philosophy of creating original new games, focused specifically on toys, fun and drama.

In January 2009, Denki launched DenkiOrNot.com, an online game which challenges players to identify the most "Denki" image from several pairs. Participants who successfully identify the majority of the images, are then offered the opportunity to contact the company's recruitment department.

Non-DiTV projects
While the majority of the titles created by Denki during this period were for DiTV platforms, the company also worked on two other significant projects

InQuizitor is a game-based learning tool, created in conjunction with educational gaming company 3MRT. lDenki provided graphic design services to the company then developing the game with 3MRT. InQuizitor was released in September 2008. It is used by educational establishments across the UK and Europe.  InQuizitor has won a number of trophies, including the 2007 eLearning Award.

Crackdown is a sandbox game developed by Realtime Worlds for the Xbox 360. When Realtime Worlds first created the concept, Denki provided design and audio consultancy for the project. Denki's input was instrumental in helping Realtime Worlds to secure its publishing agreement with Microsoft for the title. Crackdown was released in February 2007. The game received positive critical reviews and a number of awards.

Console projects
Following the company's decision to focus on the new generation of platforms, Denki was working on two original new games.

Quarrel is a strategy word puzzle game, described as "Countdown meets Risk". It is being developed for Xbox Live Arcade (XBLA). In August 2009, Denki showed Quarrel in public for the first time, at the Dare to be Digital ProtoPlay event. Several hundred people were invited to play the game and give feedback to the company. Denki is using this information to polish and shape the final months of development. In 2011, Quarrel was picked up by UTV Ignition Entertainment for iOS devices, XBLA and Facebook.

Other games
On 20 May 2010, Denki released Denki Blocks! for iOS devices, followed by Denki Blocks! HD specifically for the iPad on 23 July 2010. This was followed by a brand new game on 19 June 2010 called Juggle!.

On 16 July 2010, Denki released Denki Blocks! Daily Workout for Facebook.

On 2 August 2010, Denki announced that they had submitted Juggle! for peer review on the Xbox Live Indie Games service. It was released on 7 September 2010.

On 7 June 2011, UTV Ignition Entertainment announced they were bringing Quarrel to iOS devices, XBLA and Facebook. Quarrel was released on iOS on 25 August 2011. On 17 October 2011, the game was announced as a nominee for a BAFTA Scotland award.

On 17 September 2012, Denki announced that Ludometrics was creating a new version of Bips!, based on an existing Denki prototype. The game eventually launched on Facebook in January 2013.

On 8 November 2012, Denki announced that Save the Day was live.

On 10 December 2012, Denki announced the launch of Denki Word Quest!. On 22 November 2013, Denki announced the launch of Monster Force 5. On 14 January 2014, Denki announced the launch of All Over The Place: Australia for the BBC.

On 5 July 2017 Denki announced the public release of its "Autonauts" demo via the Itch.io gaming platform. After a successful launch the game attracted funding from the UK Games Fund, won Best Educational Game at that year's TIGA awards, and quickly became one of Itch.io's top rated free games where it has remained in the top 100 ever since.

On 11 February 2019 Denki announced to members of its Autonauts Discord server that it had signed a deal that would see Autonauts published for PC via Steam "towards the end of the year". This was followed by an announcement on 16 July 2019 by Curve Digital that it was working with Denki to bring their "unique management sim Autonauts to PC this autumn" and that the demo version had been downloaded "over 300,000" times since launching in 2017. The game was first shown publicly at that year's Gamescom conference in Cologne from 20-24 August where UKIE selected the game to receive its UK Game Of The Show award

Games
2001
Denki Blocks! – Platform: Sky Gamestar – Publisher: Rage/Sky Gamestar – Released: 31 August 2001
 Denki Blocks! – Platform: Game Boy Color – Publisher: Denki/Rage – Released: 19 October 2001
Denki Blocks! – Platform: Game Boy Advance – Publisher: Denki/Rage – Released: 19 October 2001
2002

 Super Breakout (Original) – Platform: Sky Gamestar – Publisher: Sky Gamestar/Atari – Released: 17 May 2002
 Denki Blocks! – Platform: Mobile Phone – Publisher: Denki/Digital Bridges – Released: August 2002
 Go! Go! Beckham! – Platform: GBA – Publisher: Rage – Released: 30 August 2002
 Bust-a-Move – Platform: Sky Gamestar – Publisher: Sky Gamestar/Taito – Released: 11 October 2002
 Pac-Man – Platform: Sky Gamestar – Publisher: Sky Gamestar/Namco – Released: 13 December 2002
2003

 Hulk – Platform: Sky Gamestar – Publisher: Sky Gamestar/Universal – Released: 14 August 2003
 Caterpillar Crunch – Platform: SKY Gamestar – Publisher: Denki/Sky Gamestar – Released: 14 August 2003
 Courage the Cowardly Dog in Katz Kidnap – Platform: Sky Gamestar – Publisher: Sky Gamestar/Cartoon Network – Released: 23 October 2003
 Darts – Platform: Sky Gamestar – Publisher: Sky Gamestar/Sky Sports – Released: 4 December 2003
 Duopolis – Platform: Sky Gamestar – Publisher: Sky Gamestar – Released: 4 December 2003
 Word Crunch – Platform: Sky Gamestar – Publisher: Sky Gamestar – Released: 4 December 2003
2004

 Looney Tunes: Back in Action – Platform: Sky Gamestar – Publisher: Sky Gamestar/Warner Bros. – Released: 12 February 2004
 Bips! – Platform: Sky Gamestar – Publisher: Denki/Sky Gamestar – Released: 12 February 2004
 Letter Box – Platform: Sky Gamestar – Publisher: Sky Gamestar – Released: 18 March 2004
 Tom and Jerry in Mouse Party – Platform: Sky Gamestar – Publisher: Sky Gamestar/Cartoon Network – Released: 6 May 2004
 Courage the Cowardly Dog in Katz Komeback – Platform: Sky Gamestar – Publisher: Sky Gamestar/Cartoon Network – Released: 8 July 2004
 Looney Tunes Back in Action Again – Platform: Sky Gamestar – Publisher: Sky GamestarWarner Bros. – Released: 15 July 2004
 Codename: Kids Next Door: Operation: B.I.T.T.E.R.S.W.E.E.T – Platform: Sky Gamestar – Publisher: Sky Gamestar/Cartoon Network – Released: 29 July 2004
 Courage the Cowardly Dog in Le Quack Attack – Platform: Sky Gamestar – Publisher: Sky Gamestar/Cartoon Network – Released: 9 September 2004
 Scooby-Doo Where are You? in the Mystery of Eerie Isle – Platform: Sky Gamestar – Publisher: Sky Gamestar/Cartoon Network – Released: 16 September 2004
 Thunderbirds: Flashpoint Earth – Platform: Sky Gamestar – Publisher: Sky Gamestar/Universal – Released: 14 October 2004
 Genie's Cave – Platform: Sky Gamestar – Publisher: Sky Gamestar – Released: 2 December 2004
 Tom and Jerry in Merry Christmouse – Platform: Sky Gamestar – Publisher: Sky Gamestar/Cartoon Network – Released: 16 December 2004
 Tetris – Platform: Sky Gamestar – Publisher: Sky Gamestar/The Tetris Company – Released: 16 December 2004
2005

 Codename: Kids Next Door: Operation: S.H.I.P.W.R.E.C.K.E.D – Platform: Sky Gamestar – Publisher: Sky Gamestar/Cartoon Network – Released: 6 January 2005
 Boggle – Platform: Sky Gamestar – Publisher: Sky Gamestar/Hasbro – Released: 17 February 2005
 Shrek: Fiona's Rescue – Platform: SKY Gamestar – Publisher: Sky Gamestar/DreamWorks – Released: 17 February 2005
 Dexter's Laboratory: Dexter vs. Mandark – Platform: Sky Gamestar – Publisher: Sky Gamestar/Cartoon Network – Released: 24 March 2005
 Foster's Home for Imaginary Friends: Tick Tock Terror – Platform: Sky Gamestar – Publisher: Sky Gamestar/Cartoon Network – Released: 14 April 2005
 Looney Tunes: Back in Action: Rabbit Rescue – Platform: Sky Gamestar – Publisher: Sky Gamestar – Released: 6 May 2005
 Tom and Jerry in Mansion House Mouse – Platform: Sky Gamestar – Publisher: Sky Gamestar/Cartoon Network – Released: 12 May 2005
 Jumble Fever – Platform: SKY Gamestar – Publisher: Sky Gamestar – Released: 9 June 2005
 Shrek: Disarming Charming – Platform: Sky Gamestar – Publisher: Sky Gamestar/DreamWorks – Released: 14 July 2005
 Codename: Kids Next Door: Operation R.E.V.E.N.G.E – Platform: Sky Gamestar – Publisher: Sky Gamestar/Cartoon Network – Released: 4 August 2005
 Ed, Edd 'n' Eddy: Night of the Living Ed – Platform: Sky Gamestar – Publisher: Sky Gamestar/Cartoon Network – Released: 11 August 2005
 Scooby-Doo, Where are You? in Mummy Madness – Platform: Sky Gamestar – Publisher: Sky Gamestar/Cartoon Network – Released: 8 September 2005
 Star Trek: The Next Generation: STRANDED – Platform: Sky Gamestar – Publisher: Sky Gamestar/Paramount – Released: 8 September 2005
 Wallace & Gromit: The Curse of the Were-Rabbit – Platform: Sky Gamestar – Publisher: Sky Gamestar/Aardman – Released: 6 October 2005
 Dexter's Laboratory: Mandark Strikes Back – Platform: Sky Gamestar – Publisher: Sky Gamestar/Cartoon Network – Released: 13 October 2005
 Foster's Home for Imaginary Friends: Brotherly Love – Platform: Sky Gamestar – Publisher: Sky Gamestar/Cartoon Network – Released: 10 November 2005
 Ed, Edd 'n' Eddy: Jingle-Bell Ed – Platform: Sky Gamestar – Publisher: Sky Gamestar/Cartoon Network – Released: 15 December 2005
 Scooby-Doo, Where are You? in the Curse of Mystery Mine – Platform: Sky Gamestar – Publisher: Sky Gamestar/Cartoon Network – Released: 15 December 2005
 Word Crunch Deluxe – Platform: Sky Gamestar – Publisher: Sky Gamestar – Released: 15 December 2005
 Jumble Fever: Christmas – Platform: Sky Gamestar – Publisher: Sky Gamestar – Released: 15 December 2005
 Shrek: Godmother's Revenge – Platform: Sky Gamestar – Publisher: Sky Gamestar/DreamWorks – Released: 15 December 2005
2006

 Dexter's Laboratory: Dorkster's Revenge – Platform: Sky Gamestar – Publisher: Sky Gamestar/Cartoon Network – Released: 12 January 2006
 Tom and Jerry in Duck and Cover – Platform: Sky Gamestar – Publisher: Sky Gamestar/Cartoon Network – Released: 9 February 2006
 SpongeBob SquarePants: Bikini Bottom Bother – Platform: Sky Gamestar – Publisher: Sky Gamestar/Nickelodeon – Released: 16 February 2006
 The Grim Adventures of Billy & Mandy – Platform: Sky Gamestar – Publisher: Sky Gamestar/Cartoon Network – Released: 9 March 2006
 Jumble Fever: Scooby-Doo – Platform: Sky Gamestar – Publisher: Sky Gamestar/Cartoon Network – Released: 16 March 2006
 Tomb Raider: The Reckoning: Episode 01 – Platform: Bell ExpressVu – Publisher: Bell ExpressVu/Eidos – Released: March 2006
 Who Wants to be a Millionaire? – Platform: Sky Gamestar – Publisher: Sky Gamestar/Celador – Released: 30 March 2006
 Codename: Kids Next Door: Operation: T.E.E.N.A.G.E.R – Platform: Sky Gamestar – Publisher: Sky Gamestar/Cartoon Network – Released: 6 April 2006
 Jumble Fever: Easter – Platform: Sky Gamestar – Publisher: Sky Gamestar – Released: 6 April 2006
 Who Wants to be a Millionaire? Gold – Platform: Sky Gamestar – Publisher: Sky Gamestar/Celador – Released: 20 April 2006
 SpongeBob SquarePants: Krabby Patty Kidnap – Platform: Sky Gamestar – Publisher: Sky Gamestar/Nickelodeon – Released: 27 April 2006
 Scooby-Doo! Mysteries in the Case of the Creepy Cowboy – Platform: Sky Gamestar – Publisher: Sky Gamestar/Cartoon Network – Released: 11 May 2006
 InQuizitor – Platform: PC – Publisher: 3MRT – Released: May 2006
 Shrek: Double Trouble – Platform: Sky Gamestar – Publisher: Sky Gamestar/DreamWorks – Released: 18 May 2006
 Jumble Fever: Tom and Jerry – Platform: Sky Gamestar – Publisher: Sky Gamestar/Cartoon Network – Released: 8 June 2006
 Jumble Football Fever – Platform: Sky Gamestar – Publisher: Sky Gamestar – Released: 8 June 2006
 SpongeBob SquarePants: The Flying Dutchman – Platform: Sky Gamestar – Publisher: Sky Gamestar/Nickelodeon – Released: 6 July 2006
 Scooby-Doo, Where are You? in Tomb It May Concern – Platform: Sky Gamestar – Publisher: Sky Gamestar/Cartoon Network – Released: 27 July 2006
 SpongeBob SquarePants: Save Our Sandy – Platform: Sky Gamestar – Publisher: Sky Gamestar/Nickelodeon – Released: 17 August 2006
 Shrek: Imperial Peril – Platform: Sky Gamestar – Publisher: Sky Gamestar/DreamWorks – Released: 17 August 2006
 Tomb Raider: The Reckoning: Episode 02 – Platform: Bell ExpressVu – Publisher: Bell ExpressVu/Eidos – Released: September 2006
 Tom and Jerry in Ricktey House Mouse – Platform: Sky Gamestar – Publisher: Sky Gamestar/Cartoon Network – Released: 5 October 2006
 Scooby-Doo! Mysteries in the Case of the Frosty Snowman – Platform: Sky Gamestar – Publisher: Sky Gamestar/Cartoon Network – Released: 19 October 2006
 Jumble Fever: Halloween – Platform: Sky Gamestar – Publisher: Sky Gamestar – Released: 19 October 2006
 Number Crunch – Platform: Sky Gamestar – Publisher: Denki/Sky Gamestar – Released: 9 November 2006
 All Grown Up!: Confiscated Cards – Platform: Sky Gamestar – Publisher: Sky Gamestar/Nickelodeon – Released: 7 December 2006
 Word Crunch 2: Conundrums – Platform: Sky Gamestar – Publisher: Sky Gamestar – Released: 14 December 2006
2007

 Denki Blocks! Brain Teasers Volume 01 – Platform: DirecTV Game Lounge – Publisher: Denki/DirecTV – Released: January 2007
 Hot Wheels: Monster Truck Smashdown Episode 01 – Platform: DirecTV Game Lounge – Publisher: DirecTV/Mattel – Released: January 2007
 Letter Box – Platform: DirecTV Game Lounge – Publisher: DirecTV – Released: January 2007
 Word Crunch – Platform: DirecTV Game Lounge – Publisher: DirecTV – Released: January 2007
 Barbie in the 12 Dancing Princesses – Platform: DirecTV Game Lounge – Publisher: DirecTV/Mattel – Released: January 2007
 Barbie: World Fashion Tour – Platform: DirecTV Game Lounge – Publisher: DirecTV/Mattel – Released: January 2007
 Polly Pocket: SPLASH! – Platform: DirecTV Game Lounge – Publisher: DirecTV/Mattel – Released: January 2007
 Super Break Thru – Platform: DirecTV Game Lounge – Publisher: DirecTV – Released: January 2007
 Tumble Fever – Platform: DirecTV Game Lounge – Publisher: DirecTV – Released: January 2007
 Codename: Kids Next Door: Operation: G.U.M.D.R.O.P – Platform: Sky Gamestar – Publisher: Sky Gamestar/Cartoon Network – Released: 8 February 2007
 Number Crunch – Platform: DirecTV Game Lounge – Publisher: Denki/DirecTV – Released: February 2007
 Kingpin Bowling – Platform: Sky Gamestar – Publisher: Sky Gamestar – Released: 8 February 2007
 Crackdown – Platform: PC – Publisher: Real Time Worlds/Microsoft – Released: February 2007
 Carol Vorderman's Mind Aerobics – Platform: Sky Gamestar – Publisher: Sky Gamestar – Released: 15 March 2007
 Word Crunch Volume 02 – Platform: DirecTV Game Lounge – Publisher: DirecTV – Released: March 2007
 Beehive Jumble Fever – Platform: Sky Gamestar – Publisher: Sky Gamestar – Released: 22 March 2007
 Robotboy: Kamikazi Kidnap! – Platform: Sky Gamestar – Publisher: Sky Gamestar/Cartoon Network – Released: 29 March 2007
 Tumble Fever Easter – Platform: DirecTV Game Lounge – Publisher: DirecTV – Released: March 2007
 Letter Box Deluxe – Platform: DirecTV Game Lounge – Publisher: DirecTV – Released: April 2007
 Tom and Jerry in an Eggs-plosive Easter! – Platform: Sky Gamestar – Publisher: Sky Gamestar/Cartoon Network – Released: 5 April 2007
 Jumble Quest: The Lost Pyramids – Platform: Sky Gamestar – Publisher: Sky Gamestar – Released: 5 April 2007
 Shrek Jumble Rumble – Platform: Sky Gamestar – Publisher: Sky Gamestar/DreamWorks – Released: 5 April 2007
 Carol Vorderman's Mind Aerobics: Summer Shape Up – Platform: Sky Gamestar – Publisher: Sky Gamestar – Released: 7 June 2007
 Tumble Fever Summer – Platform: DirecTV Game Lounge – Publisher: DirecTV – Released: June 2007
 Shrek the Third – Platform: Sky Gamestar – Publisher: Sky Gamestar/DreamWorks – Released: 14 June 2007
 Bugz – Platform: Sky Gamestar – Publisher: Sky Gamestar – Released: 21 June 2007
 Hot Wheels: Monster Truck Smashdown Episode 02 – Platform: DirecTV Game Lounge – Publisher: DirecTV/Mattel – Released: July 2007
 Robotboy: Something in the Darkness Drools! – Platform: Sky Gamestar – Publisher: Sky Gamestar/Cartoon Network – Released: 5 July 2007
 Tenpin Bowling – Platform: DirecTV Game Lounge – Publisher: DirecTV – Released: July 2007
 Denki Blocks! Brain Teasers Volume 02 – Platform: DirecTV Game Lounge – Publisher: Denki/DirecTV – Released: July 2007
 Jumble Fever: SpongeBob SquarePants – Platform: Sky Gamestar – Publisher: Sky Gamestar/Nickelodeon – Released: 12 July 2007
 Nicktoons: Ready Orb Not – Platform: DirecTV Game Lounge – Publisher: Waterfront/Nickelodeon – Released: July 2007
 Barbie: World Fashion Tour '07 Collection – Platform: DirecTV Game Lounge – Publisher: DirecTV/Mattel – Released: August 2007
 Darts – Platform: DirecTV Game Lounge – Publisher: DirecTV – Released: August 2007
 Quick Wit Volume 01 – Platform: DirecTV Game Lounge – Publisher: DirecTV – Released: August 2007
 The Grim Adventures of Billy & Mandy: Hell's Hamsters – Platform: Sky Gamestar – Publisher: Sky Gamestar/Cartoon Network – Released: 6 September 2007
 Reversi – Platform: DirecTV Game Lounge – Publisher: DirecTV – Released: September 2007
 Tom and Jerry in "Dynamice" – Platform: Sky Gamestar – Publisher: Sky Gamestar/Cartoon Network – Released: 13 September 2007
 Tumble Fever Halloween – Platform: DirecTV Game Lounge – Publisher: DirecTV – Released: October 2007
 Berenstain Bears – Platform: DirecTV Game Lounge – Publisher: DirecTV/PBS – Released: October 2007
 Fetch! What a State – Platform: DirecTV Game Lounge – Publisher: DirecTV/PBS – Released: October 2007
 LEGO Castle: Sword of Virtue – Platform: Sky Gamestar – Publisher: Sky Gamestar/LEGO – Released: 11 October 2007
 Tumble Fever Passions  – Platform: DirecTV Game Lounge – Publisher: DirecTV – Released: November 2007
 Ben 10: Vilgax Venom – Platform: Sky Gamestar – Publisher: Sky Games/Cartoon Network – Released: 8 November 2007
 21s – Platform: DirecTV Game Lounge – Publisher: DirecTV – Released: November 2007
 Avater Jumble Fever – Platform: Sky Gamestar – Publisher: Sky Gamestar/Nickelodeon – Released: 22 November 2007
 Robotboy: Repair or Despair – Platform: Sky Gamestar – Publisher: Sky Gamestar/Cartoon Network – Released: 29 November 2007
 Tumble Fever Xmas – Platform: DirecTV Game Lounge – Publisher: DirecTV – Released: December 2007
 SpongeBob SquarePants: Snow Woes: – Platform: Sky Gamestar – Publisher: Sky Gamestar/Nickelodeon – Released: 6 December 2007
 The Muppet Show: Backstage Rampage – Platform: Sky Gamestar – Publisher: Sky Gamestar/Disney – Released: 13 December 2007
2008

 Tumbler – Platform: DirecTV Game Lounge – Publisher: DirecTV – Released: February 2008
 Ben 10: Call of the Wildmutt – Platform: Sky Gamestar – Publisher: Sky Games/Cartoon Network – Released:  7 February 2008
 Barbie Luv me 3 Puppy Tricks – Platform: DirecTV Game Lounge – Publisher: DirecTV/Mattel – Released:  February 2008
 Tumble Fever Flash – Platform: DirecTV Web portal – Publisher: DirecTV – Released: March 2008
 Hot Wheels: Monster Truck Smashdown Episode 03 – Platform: DirecTV Game Lounge – Publisher: DirecTV/Mattel – Released:  March 2008
 Denki's Sticky Blocks! – Platform: Sky Gamestar – Publisher: Denki/Sky Gamestar – Released: 6 March 2008
 Word Crunch Deluxe – Platform: DirecTV Game Lounge – Publisher: DirecTV – Released: March 2008
 Polly Pocket: Polly Wheels Episode 01 – Platform: DirecTV Game Lounge – Publisher: DirecTV/Mattel – Released: March 2008
 Tetris 2008 – Platform: Sky Gamestar – Publisher: SKY Gamestar/The Tetris Company – Released: 6 March 2008
 Polly Pocket: SPLASH! Episode 02 – Platform: DirecTV Game Lounge – Publisher: DirecTV/Mattel – Released:  April 2008
 Pat Sajak's Code Letter Crossword Connections – Platform: DirecTV Game Lounge – Publisher: DirecTV/Pat Sajak Games – Released:  April 2008
 Tom and Jerry in "Dynamice 2" – Platform: Sky Gamestar – Publisher: Sky Gamestar/Cartoon Network – Released:  8 May 2008
 Ben 10: Upchuck Unveiled – Platform: Sky Gamestar – Publisher SKY Gamestar/Cartoon Network – Released: 5 June 2008
 Mad Libs – Platform: DirecTV Game Lounge – Publisher: DirecTV – Released: June 2008
 Polly Pocket: Polly Wheels Episode 02 – Platform: DirecTV Game Lounge – Publisher: DirecTV/Mattel – Released: July 2008
 Robotboy: Tag Team Trouble – Platform: Sky Gamestar – Publisher: Sky Gamestar/Cartoon Network – Released: 14 August 2008
 Spin to Win – Platform: DirecTV Game Lounge – Publisher: DirecTV – Released: August 2008
 Sundae Scoop – Platform: DirecTV Game Lounge – Publisher: DirecTV – Released: August 2008
 Pat Sajak's Lost & Found Words – Platform: DirecTV Game Lounge – Publisher: DirecTV/Pat Sajak Games – Released: August 2008
 Quick Wit Volume 02 – Platform: DirecTV Game Lounge – Publisher: DirecTV – Released: October 2008
 Golden Balls – Platform: Sky Gamestar – Publisher: Sky Gamestar/Endemol – Released: 9 October 2008
 SpongeBob SquarePants: Forest of Fear – Platform: Sky Gamestar – Publisher: Sky Gamestar/Nickelodeon – Released: 9 October 2008
 Crunch Time – Platform: Sky Gamestar – Publisher: Sky Gamestar – Released: 4 December 2008
 WALL-E – Platform: DirecTV Game Lounge – Publisher: DirecTV/Disney-Pixar – Released: 4 December 2008
 Ben 10: Howlin' Benwolf – Platform: Sky Gamestar – Publisher: Sky Gamestar/Cartoon Network – Released: December 2008
2009

 SpongeBob SquarePants: Journey to the Centre of Patrick – Platform: DirecTV Game Lounge – Publisher: DirecTV/Nickelodeon – Released: March 2009
 Family Fortunes – Platform: Sky Gamestar – Publisher: Sky Gamestar/Fremantle – Released: 19 March 2009
 Ben 10 Alien Force: Swampfired Up – Platform: Sky Gamestar – Publisher: Sky Gamestar/Cartoon Network – Released: 2 April 2009
2010

 Denki Blocks! – Platform: iOS Devices – Released: 19 May 2010
 Juggle! – Platform: iOS Devices – Released: 20 June 2010
 Denki Blocks! Daily Workout – Platform: Facebook –  Released: July 2010
 Juggle! – Platform: Xbox Live Indie Games – Released: 7 September 2010
 Big Cup Cricket – Platform: iOS Devices – Publisher: Square Enix –  Released: 6 December 2010
2011

 Big Hit Baseball – Platform: iOS Devices – Publisher: Square Enix –  Released: February 2011
 Quarrel – Platform: iOS Devices – Publisher: UTV Ignition Entertainment – Released: 25 August 2011
2012

 Quarrel – Platform: Xbox Live Arcade – Publisher: UTV Ignition Entertainment – Released: 25 January 2012
 Save the Day – Platform: HTML5 Browser – Publisher: Turbulenz – Released: 8 November 2012
 Denki Word Quest! – Platform: HTML5 Browser – Publisher: Turbulenz – Released: 10 December 2012
2013

 Denki Blocks! – Platform: HTML5 Browser – Publisher: Turbulenz – Released: 14 January 2013
 Monster Force 5 – Platform: HTML5 Browser – Publisher: Turbulenz – Released: 12 November 2013
 Moshi Monsters: Music – Platform: iOS & Android Devices – Publisher: Mind Candy – Released: 21 November 2013
 Par Tribus – Platform: iOS & Android Devices – Released: 21 November 2013
2014

 All Over the Place Australia – Platform: HTML5 Browser – Publisher: British Broadcasting Corporation – Released: January 2014
 Jigmania: Snow White – Platform: Browser – Publisher: Spil Games – Released: March 2014
2019

 Autonauts – Platform: Microsoft Windows – Publisher: Curve Digital – Released: October 2019

Other games by Denki 

iCarly –  Platform: DirecTV Game Lounge Publisher: DirecTV/Nickelodeon
Recess – Platform: DirecTV Game Lounge Publisher: DirecTV/Disney
Tom and Jerry Food Fight 1,2,3 – Platform:Sky Gamestar/Sky Games Publisher: Sky Games/Sky Gamestar/Nickelodeon
Cartoon Carnage – Platform: Sky Gamestar/Sky Games Publisher: Sky Gamestar/Sky Games/Cartoon Network
SpongeBob Jellyfishing – Platform:Sky Gamestar/Sky Games Publisher:Sky Gamestar/Sky Games/ Nickelodeon
Shrek Forever After – Platform:Sky Gamestar/Sky Games Publisher:Sky Gamestar/Sky games/DreamWorks
Generator Rex – Platform:Sky Gamestar/Sky Games Publisher:Sky Gamestar/Sky Games/Cartoon Network
Dexter's Laboratory: Return of the Dorkster – Platform:Sky Gamestar/Sky Games Publisher:Sky Gamestar/Sky Games/Cartoon Network
Avatar: The Last Airbender™ – Platform:Directtv Game Lounge Publisher:DirecTV/Nickelodeon
Avatar 2 – Platform:Directtv Game Lounge Publisher:DirecTV/Nickelodeon

Awards
Denki Blocks – ECTS 2001 Overall Best Game of Show; Best Handheld Game of the Show
Develop Industry Excellence Awards – Best Emerging-Platform Developer (2003)
TIGA – Best Developer (2007)
 Quarrel – BAFTA Scotland 2011, Best Game
 Quarrel – BAFTA Video Game Awards 2012, Best Mobile & Handheld Game – nomination
 Quarrel – The Independent Game Developer Awards 2012, Best Serious Game
 Quarrel – The Independent Game Developer Awards 2012, Best Social Game

References

External links
 Official website

Video game companies of the United Kingdom
Video game companies established in 2000
Video game development companies
Companies based in Dundee